Bülent Emin Yarar (born 1 January 1961) is a Turkish actor and theatre director.

Life and career 
Yarar was born in Ankara. He became interested in theatre at a young age after watching several plays with his family. He didn't participate in any professional plays until the end of high school. As his father was a violinist, Yarar became interested in music as well and enrolled in Mimar Sinan University Start Conservatory to learn singing. While learning opera, he joined the Turkish State Theatres as an extra actor and began working on the stage. The first play that he had a role in was İstanbul Efendisi.

Due to pressures from his family, he eventually enrolled in the theatre department of the university that he was studying at and graduated in 1989. In the same year he began working at the Diyarbakır State Theatre. Between 1994–1995, he worked for Istanbul State Theatre. 
  
After returning to Istanbul, he directed the plays Ada and Getto for Tiyatro Ti. In 1998, he joined Tiyatro Studios and was cast in the leading role in The Balcony by Jean Genet, and in 1999 he had a leading role in an adaptation of Cyrano de Bergerac. After beginning to work for Oyun Studios, he was cast in Ermişler ya da Günahkarlar alongside Haluk Bilginer and Şenay Gürler. Together with Işıl Kasapoğlu, he directed the play Mem ile Zin for Semaver Company.

Aside from his career on stage, he has appeared in various cinema and television productions.

Filmography 
 Heartsong (2022) - Mirze
 Ayak İşleri (2021) - Sermet Abi
 Dip (2018) - Ali Kemal
 Karışık Kaset (2014) - Ali
 20 Dakika (2013) - Kedi Mesut Bilaloğlu
 Kalbim 4 Mevsim (2012) - Necmi
 Celal Tan ve Ailesinin Aşırı Acıklı Hikayesi (2011)
 Başlangıç (2011)
 Öğretmen Kemal (2010) - Kemal Güngör
 Beş Şehir (2009) - Tevfik
 Dersimiz Atatürk (2009) -
 Güneşin Oğlu (2008) - Kurban Murat
 Arka Sıradakiler (2007–2010) - Kemal Güngör
 Sapak (2007) -
 Zincirbozan (2007) - Bülent Ecevit
 Beş Vakit (2006) - İmam
 Korkuyorum Anne (2006) - Kasap
 Kız Babası (TV) (2006) - Cevahir Kılıç
 Dişi Kuş (TV) (2004) - Reşat Nuri
 Kalp Gözü (TV) (2004) -
 Çamur (2002) - Halil
 Kaç Para Kaç (1999) - Selim's friend
 Süper Baba (TV) (1996–97) - Lawyer
 Hoşçakal (1989) - Yavuz's friend

Awards 

 17th International Adana Golden Cocoon Film Festival : Best Supporting Actor - Beş Şehir - 2010
 14th Afife Theatre Awards : Most Successful Actor of the Year - Professional - 2010
 İsmail Dümbüllü Awards : Special Award - 2007
 9th Afife Theatre Awards : Most Successful Actor of the Year - Çayhane and Diktat - 2005
 5th Lions Theatre Awards : Most Successful Comedy Actor of the Year - Çayhane - 2005
 MSM Awards : Art Award - Cyrano de Bergerac - 2000
 4th Afife Theatre Awards : Most Successful Supporting Actor of the Year - The Resistible Rise of Arturo Ui - 2000
 Ankara Art Institute Awards : Praiseworthy Actor Award - Miletos Güzeli - 1994

References

External links 
 

1961 births
Turkish male stage actors
Turkish theatre directors
Turkish male film actors
Turkish male television actors
Male actors from Ankara
Living people